is a milk products and sweets company based in Tokyo, Japan, in operation since September 1, 1917. Their products include milk products, drinks, candy, confectioneries, and infant formula. Morinaga has distribution agreements with Mondelez International and Kalbe Farma. Its subsidiaries include Morinaga Hokuriku Dairy. Morinaga Milk celebrated its 100th anniversary in 2017. In addition to condensed milk and infant formula, products that it has offered since its founding, it has also produced a wide range of products based on milk, including Morinaga Milk, Bifidus Yogurt, Creap (creaming powder), and Mt. RAINIER CAFFE LATTE.

See also 
 
 Morinaga Milk arsenic poisoning incident

References

External links

 

Japanese companies established in 1917
Food and drink companies established in 1917
Companies listed on the Tokyo Stock Exchange
Dairy products companies of Japan
Drink companies of Japan
Food and drink companies based in Tokyo
Morinaga & Company
Confectionery companies of Japan
1950s initial public offerings